Northside Historic District or North Side Historic District may refer to:

United States 

Northside Historic District (Opelika, Alabama), listed on the National Register of Historic Places (NRHP) in Lee County
Northside Historic Residential District, Lexington, Kentucky, NRHP-listed in Fayette County
North Side Historic District (Peoria, Illinois), NRHP-listed in Peoria County
Old Northside Historic District, Indianapolis, Indiana
Martinsville Northside Historic District, Martinsville, Indiana
Plymouth Northside Historic District, Plymouth, Indiana
Northside Village Historic District, Charlton, Massachusetts
Northside Historic District (Yarmouth, Massachusetts)
Great Falls Northside Residential Historic District, Great Falls, Montana NRHP-listed in Cascade County
Northside Missoula Railroad Historic District, NRHP-listed in Missoula County
Northside Historic District (Elizabeth City, North Carolina)
Northside Historic District (Waterford, New York)
Near Northside Historic District (Columbus, Ohio), NRHP-listed in Columbus
Brownsville Northside Historic District, Brownsville, Pennsylvania
Near North Side Historic District (Houston, Texas), NRHP-listed in inner Harris County
North Side Historic District (Palestine, Texas), NRHP-listed in Anderson County
Northside Historic District of Cream Brick Workers' Cottages, Racine, NRHP-listed in Racine County, Wisconsin

See also
Near Northside Historic District (disambiguation)